Acleris nigrilineana is a species of moth of the family Tortricidae. It is found in Korea, Japan, the Russian Far East and Denmark, Norway, Sweden, Finland, Poland, European Russia, Estonia and Latvia.

The wingspan is 23 mm for both males and females.

The larvae feed on Abies sachalinensis and Abies alba.

Taxonomy
Some sources list the species as a subspecies of Acleris abietana.

References

Moths described in 1963
nigrilineana
Moths of Europe
Moths of Asia